Ewok or Ewoks may refer to:
 Ewok
 Ewoks (soundtrack)
 Ewoks (TV series)
 Ewoks: The Battle for Endor
 Enabling Women of Kamand (EWOK)

See also 
 Ewok Celebration
 Caravan of Courage: An Ewok Adventure
 Star Wars: Return of the Jedi: Ewok Adventure